John Ferrers (26 July 1629 – 14 August 1680) was an English politician who sat in the House of Commons  in 1660.

Ferrers was the son of Sir Humphrey Ferrers of Tamworth Castle. In 1660, Ferrers was elected Member of Parliament for Derbyshire in the Convention Parliament. 
 
Ferrers died at the age of  51 and was buried in Tamworth Church, where he was given a rich baroque monument.

Ferrers married  Anne Carleton, daughter of Sir Dudley Carleton of Imber Court. His son Humphrey predeceased him and Tamworth Castle and its titles passed to his granddaughter Anne, who married Robert Shirley.

References

1629 births
1680 deaths
English MPs 1660
People from Tamworth, Staffordshire
Place of birth missing
Burials in Staffordshire